The Oxfordshire Record Society is a text publication society for the county of Oxfordshire in England. It was established in 1919.

Selected publications
 Vol.  1 : The Chantry certificates and The Edwardian inventories of church goods, edited by Graham Rose (1919)
 Vols. 2, 4, 11 : Parochial collections made by Anthony Wood and Richard Rawlinson, edited by F N Davis (1920-9)
 Vol.  3 : Newington Longeville charters, edited by H E Salter (1921)
 Vol.  5 : Herbert Barnett Glympton : the history of an Oxfordshire manor, edited by Herbert Barnett (1923)
 Vol.  6 : Churchwardens' accounts of Marston, Spelsbury, Pyrton, edited by F W Weaver and G N Clark (1924)
 Vol.  7 : The early history of Mapledurham, edited by A H Cooke (1925)
 Vol.  8 : Adderbury "rectoria" : the manor at Adderbury belonging to New College, Oxford : the building of the chancel, 1408- 1418 : account rolls, deeds and court rolls, edited by T F Hobson (1926)
 Vol.  9 : The manors and advowson of Great Rollright, edited by Reginald W Jeffery (1927)
 Vol.  10 : The churchwardens' presentments in the Oxfordshire peculiars of Dorchester, Thame, and Banbury, edited by Sidney A Peyton (1928)
 Vol.  12 : The feet of fines for Oxfordshire 1195-1291, edited by H E Salter (1930)
 Vols. 13 and 14 : A collection of charters relating to Goring, Streatley and the neighborhood, 1181-1546, preserved in the Bodleian Library, edited by T R Gambier-Parry (1931-2)
 Vol.  15 : Saxon Oxfordshire : charters and ancient highways, edited by G B Grundy (1933)
 Vol.  16 : Oxfordshire justices of the peace in the seventeenth century, edited by Mary Sturge Gretton (1934)
 Vol.  17 : The history of Dean and Chalford, edited by M D Lobel (1935)
 Vol.  18 : Eynsham under the monks, edited by Edmund Chambers (1936)
 Vols. 19 and 22 : The Sandford cartulary, edited by Agnes M Leys (1938–41)
 Vol.  20 : Tusmore papers, edited by L G Wickham Legg (1939)
 Vol.  21 : Hearth tax returns : Oxfordshire 1665, edited by Maureen M B Weinstock (1940)
 Vols. 23 and 24 : The Archdeacon's court : Liber actorum 1584, edited by E R Brinkworth (1942-6)
 Vols. 25 and 26 : The Thame cartulary, edited by H E Salter (1947-8)
 Vol.  27 : The progress notes of Warden Woodward round the Oxfordshire estates of New College, Oxford, 1659-1675, edited by R L Rickard (1949)
 Vols. 28, 30, 32 and 34 : The church bells of Oxfordshire, edited by Frederick Sharpe (1949–53)
 Vols. 29, 31 and 33 : Journal of Sir Samuel Luke, edited by I G Phillip (1950-3)
 Vol.  35 : Bishop Wilberforce's visitation returns for the Archdeaconry of Oxford in the year 1854, edited by E P Baker (1954)
 Vol.  36 : Oxfordshire protestation returns 1641-2, edited by Christopher S A Dobson (1955)
 Vol.  37 : Wheatley records 956-1956, edited by W O Hassall (1956)
 Vol.  38: Articles of enquiry addressed to the clergy of the diocese of Oxford at the primary visitation of Dr Thomas Secker 1738, edited by H A Lloyd Jukes (1957)
 Vol.  39 : Some Oxfordshire wills proved in the Prerogative Court of Canterbury 1393-1510, edited by J R H Weaver and A Beardwood (1958)
 Vol.  40 : Index to wills proved in the Peculiar Court of Banbury, 1542- 1858, and Custumal (1391) and Bye-laws (1386-1540) of the Manor of Islip, edited by J S W Gibson and Barbara F Harvey (1959)
 Vol.  41 : Henley Borough records : Assembly books i-iv, 1395-1543, edited by P M Briers (1960)
 Vol.  42 : The papers of Captain Henry Stevens, waggon-mastergeneral to King Charles I, edited by Margaret Toynbee (1961)
 Vols. 43 and 49 : The Royalist ordnance papers 1642-1646, edited by Ian Roy (1964–75)
 Vol.  44 : Household and farm inventories in Oxfordshire 1550-1590, edited by M A Havinden (1965)
 Vol.  45 : Index of persons in Oxfordshire deeds acquired by the Bodleian Library 1878-1963, edited by W O Hassall (1966)
 Vol.  46 : Oxfordshire hundred rolls of Bampton and Witney Borough 1279, edited by T Stone and P Hyde (1969)
 Vol.  47 : The letter-books of Samuel Wilberforce 1843-68, edited by R K Pugh (1970)
 Vol.  48 : Agricultural trade unionism in Oxfordshire 1872-81, edited by Pamela Horn (1974)
 Vol.  50 : Manorial records of Cuxham, Oxfordshire, circa 1200-1359, edited by P D A Harvey (1976)
 Vol.  51 : Village education in nineteenth-century Oxfordshire, incorporating the Whitchurch school log book 1868-93, edited by Pamela Horn (1978)
 Vol.  52 : Bishop Fell and nonconformity - visitation documents from the Oxford diocese 1682-83, edited by Mary Clapinson (1980)
 Vol.  53 : Oxfordshire sessions of the peace in the reign of Richard II, edited by Elisabeth G Kimball (1983)
 Vol.  54: Calendar of the court books of the borough of Witney 1538-1610, edited by James L Bolton and Marjorie M Maslen (1985)
 Vol.  55 : Church and chapel in Oxfordshire 1851 - the return of the census of religious worship, edited by Kate Tiller (1987)
 Vol.  56 : The Oxfordshire Eyre 1241, edited by Janet Cooper (1989)
 Vol.  57 : The correspondence of Thomas Secker, Bishop of Oxford 1737-58, edited by A P Jenkins (1991)
 Vol.  58 : Woodstock chamberlains' accounts 1609-50, edited by Marjorie Maslen (1993)
 Vol.  59 : Oxfordshire and North Berkshire Protestation Returns and tax assessments 1641-42, edited by Jeremy Gibson (1994)
 Vol.  60 : The Oxfordshire Muster Rolls, 1539, 1542 and 1569, edited by Peter C Beauchamp (1996)
 Vol.  61 : Index to the probate records of the Courts of the Bishop and Archdeacon of Oxford, 1733-1857, and of the Oxfordshire Peculiars, 1547-1856, edited by D M Barratt, Joan Howard-Drake and Mark Priddey (1997)
 Vol.  62 : The Brightwell parish diaries, edited by Mark Spurrell (1998)
 Vol.  63 : Calendar of the Court Books of the Borough of New Woodstock 1588-1595, edited by Royston F Taylor (2002)
 Vol.  64 : Oxfordshire Forests 1246-1609, edited by Beryl Schumer (2002)
 Vol.  65 : Calendar of the Court Books of the Borough of New Woodstock 1607-1622, edited by Royston F Taylor, Mary Hodges et al. (2007)
 Vol.  66 : The diocese Books of Samuel Wilberforce, Bishop of Oxford 1845-1869, edited by Ronald and Margaret Pugh (2008)
 Vol.  67 : An Historical Atlas of Oxfordshire, edited by Kate Tiller and Giles Darkes (2010)
 Vol.  68 : Oxfordshire Friendly Societies 1750-1918, edite by Shaun Morley (2011)
 Vol.  69 : The Life and Times of a Charlbury Quaker - the Journals of William Jones 1784-1818, edited by Hannah Jones (2014)
 Vol.  70 : Wood's Radley College Diary 1855-1861, edited by Mark Spurrell (2016)
 Vol.  71 : Records of Holton Park Girls' Grammar School 1948-1972, edited by Marilyn Yurdan (2017)

See also
 Oxford Historical Society

References

External links 

1919 establishments in England
History of Oxfordshire
Historical societies of the United Kingdom
Text publication societies
Organisations based in Oxfordshire